John Michael Greer (born 1962) is an American author and druid who writes on ecology, politics, appropriate technology, oil depletion and the occult.

Personal life
Greer was born in Bremerton, Washington and was raised in the Seattle area. He is an initiate in Freemasonry and the Hermetic Order of the Golden Dawn. He currently lives in East Providence, Rhode Island with his wife Sara.

Druidry 
Greer came to Druidry by way of the Order of Bards, Ovates and Druids in 1995 after some twenty years’ involvement in Hermetic occult spirituality. He received the Mount Haemus Award in 2003 from OBOD for his lecture "Phallic Religion in the Druid Revival".  He served as Grand Archdruid of the Ancient Order of Druids in America (AODA), an initiatory organization teaching Celtic nature spirituality, from 2003–2015.  He wrote The Druidry Handbook, which serves as the AODA’s core textbook and curriculum.  

Greer also created the training program for the Druidical Order of the Golden Dawn, an order which fuses druidry with Golden Dawn ceremonial magic, which he founded in 2013. He wrote The Celtic Golden Dawn: An Original & Complete Curriculum of Druidical Study, which serves as the orders’s core textbook and curriculum.

Occultism 
He has blogged on occult topics on The Well of Galabes (2014-2017), which is now hosted on Ecosophia. He currently writes on political astrology using mundane ingress charts via the subscription services SubscribeStar and Patreon.

Politics and nonfiction 
Greer describes himself as a moderate Burkean conservative, influenced by the political theorist Edmund Burke. He is currently blogging at Ecosophia, where he has written about the intersection of magic and politics.  

He previously blogged at The Archdruid Report on peak oil, economics, history, philosophy and related topics from 2006–2017. He believes that gradual societal collapse will ensue as fossil fuel–powered industries and societies decline through resource depletion. In a 2009 blog post entitled "Hagbard's Law", he contrasted the attention global warming receives compared to peak oil. 

In a 2005 abstract, called How Civilizations Fall: A Theory of Catabolic Collapse, he wrote an ecological model of collapse in which production fails to meet maintenance requirements for existing capital.

In The King in Orange (2021), Greer analyses the contemporary American political landscape through class analysis and occult practices. Focusing on the election and opposition to Donald Trump as president of the United States, Greer predicts a continuing combination of magic and politics from the various class factions of the country. He criticises the openness of liberal occultists, arguing that magical practices benefit from more obscurity and secrecy.

Fiction 
Greer has written many novels, including a series of eleven fantasy novels based on the worlds created by H.P. Lovecraft and his Cthulhu Mythos entitled "The Weird of Hali". He has also written deindustrial science fiction and a political-military thriller Twilight’s Last Gleaming.

Reception 
Writing in The Futurist magazine, Rick Docksai declared that Greer's book The Ecotechnic Future is "as realistic a portrayal of the end of civilization as one is likely to find." It was also positively reviewed in Choice: Current Reviews for Academic Libraries and was recommended in the industry journal Energy Policy. The International Journal of Agricultural Sustainability referred to his book The Wealth of Nature as "challeng[ing] the paradigms that underlie the complex system of wealth distribution we know as economics."

His book The New Encyclopedia of the Occult was selected as a reference text in 2005 by American Libraries and noted by Booklist and Publishers Weekly.

Works

Spirituality and the occult 
Inside a Magical Lodge: Group Ritual in the Western Tradition (Llewellyn, 1998), (New Edition, Aeon Books, March 2021)
Monsters: An Investigator's Guide to Magical Beings (Llewellyn, 2001)(rev. and expanded, 3rd ed. Aeon Books, 2021)
The New Encyclopedia of the Occult (Llewellyn, 2003)
Learning Ritual Magic: Fundamental Theory and Practice for the Solitary Apprentice, co-authored with Clare Vaughn and Earl King, Jr (Weiser, 2004)
A World Full of Gods: An Inquiry into Polytheism (ADF Publishing, 2005)
Encyclopedia of Natural Magic (Llewellyn, 2005)
The Druidry Handbook: Spiritual Practice Rooted in the Living Earth (Weiser Books, January 2006)
Atlantis: Ancient Legacy, Hidden Prophecy (Llewellyn, 2007)
Pagan Prayer Beads: Magic and Meditation with Pagan Rosaries, co-authored with Clare Vaughn (Weiser, 2007)
The Druid Magic Handbook: Ritual Magic Rooted in the Living Earth (Weiser, 2007)
The Art and Practice of Geomancy: Divination, Magic, and Earth Wisdom of the Renaissance (Weiser, 2009)
Element Encyclopedia of Secret Societies: The Ultimate A–Z of Ancient Mysteries, Lost Civilizations and Forgotten Wisdom (HarperCollins, 2009)
The UFO Phenomenon: Fact, Fantasy and Disinformation (Llewellyn, March 2009)
Secrets of the Lost Symbol (Llewellyn, January 2010)
The Druid Revival Reader, ed. John Michael Greer (Starseed, 2011)
Apocalypse Not: Everything You Know about 2012, Nostradamus and the Rapture Is Wrong (Viva, September 2011)
The Druid Grove Handbook: A Guide to Ritual in the Ancient Order of Druids in America, ed. John Michael Greer (Starseed, 2011)
The Blood of the Earth: An Essay on Magic and Peak Oil (Scarlet Imprint, 2012)
Apocalypse: A History of the End of Time (Quercus, April 2012)
Mystery Teachings From the Living Earth (Weiser, 2012)
The Gnostic Celtic Church: A Manual and Book of Liturgy, ed. John Michael Greer (Starseed, 2013)
The Celtic Golden Dawn: An Original & Complete Curriculum of Druidical Study (Llewellyn, 2013)
The Illustrated Picatrix: The Complete Occult Classic Of Astrological Magic translated by John Michael Greer & Christopher Warnock (Lulu, March 2015) 
The Golden Dawn: The Original Account of the Teachings, Rites, and Ceremonies of the Hermetic Order Study, Israel Regardie ed. John Michael Greer (Llewellyn, January 2016) 
The Secret of the Temple (Llewellyn, December 2016)
Circles of Power: An Introduction to Hermetic Magic, third edition (Aeon Books, 2017)
The Academy of the Sword by Gérard Thibault d'Anvers trans. John Michael Greer (Aeon Books, February 2017)
Paths of Wisdom: Cabala in the Golden Dawn Tradition, third edition (Aeon Books, 2017)
The Coelbren Alphabet: The Forgotten Oracle of the Welsh Bards (Llewellyn, 2017)
The Occult Book: A Chronological Journey from Alchemy to Wicca (Sterling Chronologies, 2017)
Elementary Treatise of Occult Science, co-authored with Papus and Mark Mikituk, (Llewellyn, December 2018) 
Ascendant: Modern Essays on Polytheism and Theology Contributor, (Independently Published, January 2019)
The Conspiracy Book: A Chronological Journey through Secret Societies and Hidden Histories (Sterling, January 2019) 
How to Become a Mage, co-authored with K. K. Albert, Joséphin Péladan and Jean-Louis de Biasi, (Llewellyn, June 2019) 
A Magical Education: Talks on Magic and Occultism (Aeon Books, 2019)
Ascendant II: Theology for Modern Polytheists Contributor,(Independently Published, December 2019)
Llewellyn's Complete Book of Ceremonial Magick: A Comprehensive Guide to the Western Mystery Tradition Contributor, (Llewellyn, 2020) 
On the Shadows of the Ideas Giordano Bruno translated by John Michael Greer (Arcane Wisdom, 10 March 2020)
The Mysteries of Merlin (Llewellyn, 2020)
Beyond the Narratives: Essays on Occultism and the Future (Aeon Books, October 2020)
The UFO Chronicles: How Science Fiction, Shamanic Experiences, and Secret Air Force Projects Created the UFO Myth (Aeon Books, October 2020)
The Sacred Geometry Oracle: Book and Card Deck (Aeon Books, April 2021)
The King in Orange: The Magical and Occult Roots of Political Power (Inner Traditions, June 2021)

Economics and politics  
The Long Descent: A User's Guide to the End of the Industrial Age (New Society Publishers, September 2008)
The Ecotechnic Future: Envisioning a Post-Peak World (New Society Publishers, October 2009) 
The Wealth of Nature: Economics As If Survival Mattered (New Society Publishers, May 2011)  
Green Wizardry (New Society, 2013)
Not the Future we Ordered: Peak Oil, Psychology and the Myth of Progress (Karnac, 2013)
Decline and Fall: the End of Empire and the Future of Democracy in the 21st Century (New Society, 2014)
Collapse Now and Avoid the Rush: the Best of the Archdruid Report (Founders House, 2015)
After Progress: Reason and Religion at the End of the Industrial Age Paperback (New Society Publishers, April 2015)
Dark Age America: Climate Change, Cultural Collapse, and the Hard Future Ahead (New Society Publishers, September 2016)
The Retro Future: Looking to the Past to Remake the Future (New Society, 2017)
The King in Orange: The magical and occult roots of political power (Inner Traditions Bear and Company, 2021)

Fiction  
Twilight's Last Gleaming (Karnac, 2014) 
Star's Reach: A Novel of the Deindustrial Future (Founders House, April 2014)
The Fires of Shalsha (Starseed Press, 2008) (Founders House, 2015)
Retrotopia (Founders House, 2016) 
An Archdruid's Tales: Fiction From The Archdruid Report (Founders House Publishing, 2017) 
The Weird of Hali (Book 1): Innsmouth (Founders House Publishing, 2018) 
The Weird of Hali (Book 2):  Kingsport (Founders House Publishing, 2018) 
The Weird of Hali (Book 3):  Chorazin (Founders House Publishing, 2019) 
The Weird of Hali (Book 4):  Dreamlands (Founders House Publishing, 2019) 
The Weird of Hali (Book 5):  Providence (Founders House Publishing, 2019) 
The Weird of Hali (Book 6):  Red Hook (Founders House Publishing, 2019) 
The Weird of Hali (Book 7):  Arkham (Founders House Publishing, 2019) 
The Shoggoth Concerto (Founders House Publishing, 2019) 
The Nyogtha Variations (Founders House Publishing, 2020) 
A Voyage to Hyperborea (Founders House Publishing, 2020) 
The Seal of Yueh Lao (Founders House Publishing, 2020) 
The Weird of Hali Companion (Founders House Publishing, 2021)

Anthologies edited 
After Oil: SF Visions of a Post-Petroleum World (Founders House, 2012
After Oil 2: The Years of Crisis (Founders House, 2014)
After Oil 3: The Years of Rebirth (Founders House, 2015)
After Oil 4: The Future's Distant Shores (Founders House, 2016)
Merigan Tales: Stories for the World of Star's Reach (Founders House,2016)

See also
 Dmitry Orlov (writer) – A Russian-American engineer who writes on Peak Oil and economic, ecological and political decline.
 David Fleming (writer) - An English historian and economist who writes about the importance of culture and community in response to the eventual collapse of the market economy.
 James Howard Kunstler – An American author who writes about the end of industrialized society, suburbia and urban development.

Notes

References

External links
 
 

1962 births
Living people
People from Bremerton, Washington
20th-century American novelists
21st-century American novelists
American male bloggers
American bloggers
American encyclopedists
American conservationists
American male novelists
American occultists
American astrologers
American occult writers
American modern pagans
Futurologists
Hermetic Qabalists
Neo-druids
20th-century American male writers
21st-century American male writers
Modern pagan writers
20th-century American non-fiction writers
21st-century American non-fiction writers